David Blue is a folk album by David Blue, released by Elektra in 1966. 

The album was produced by Arthur Gorson and recorded by Jac Holzman, with Bill Szymczyk as engineer; the sleeve featured photographs by Joel Brodsky (front) and William S. Harvey (back).

Reception
David Blue was selected for The MOJO Collection as one of the most significant albums in musical history.

Richie Unterberger criticised David Blue for being derivative of Bob Dylan, particularly the recently-released Highway 61 Revisited and Blonde on Blonde, but wrote that "If the songs on David Blue sometimes seemed like Dylan prototypes that had been thrown in the kitchen sink and tossed in the washing machine several times over, its stronger tracks were nevertheless quite enjoyable variations of their obvious model."

Track listing

Personnel
David Blue — vocals, acoustic guitar, electric guitar
 Monte Dunn — acoustic guitar, electric guitar
Buddy Saltzman — drums
Herbie Lovelle — drums
Harvey Brooks — bass
Paul Harris — piano, organ, electric piano, celesta

References

1966 albums
Albums with cover art by Joel Brodsky
Elektra Records albums